Money Heist: Korea – Joint Economic Area is a Korean television series and second series in the Money Heist franchise, based on the original Spanish series. The Korean series directed by Kim Hong-sun and written by Ryu Yong-jae, is an original Netflix series, starring Yoo Ji-tae, Yunjin Kim, Park Hae-soo, Jeon Jong-seo, Lee Hyun-woo, Lee Won-jong, and Park Myung-hoon. It depicts a hostage crisis situation set in a unified Korean Peninsula, involving a genius strategist and people with different personalities and abilities. The first 6 episodes were released on June 24, 2022, on Netflix.
The second part was released on December 9, 2022.

Synopsis 
The series follows the storyline and characters of the original Spanish series. "The Professor" (Yoo Ji-tae), a strategist criminal mastermind, plans to pull off a heist in the reunified Korean Peninsula. The operation involves strategists and desperados with different characteristics and abilities, who have to face unusual situations. Thieves overtake the mint of a unified Korea. With hostages trapped inside, the police must stop them, as well as the operation's shadowy mastermind.

Cast

The gang 
 Yoo Ji-tae as Professor / Park Sun-ho
 The mastermind of a 4 trillion won heist. He is the boyfriend of police inspector Seon Woo-jin and the Korean version of the original Professor who he is portrayed by Álvaro Morte.
 Park Hae-soo as Berlin / Song Jung-ho
 A 41-year-old North Korean former prisoner of the Kaechon concentration camp, where he served 25 years' detention since age nine as a result of attempted defection. He tends to resort to violence and tries to use fear to threaten the hostages, unlike the Professor's intention to not harm anyone and is the Korean version of the original Berlin who he is portrayed by Pedro Alonso.
Jeon Jong-seo as Tokyo / Lee Hong-dan
 A North Korean woman with military training who was wanted for committing armed robberies and murders of loan sharks (who extorted penniless North Korean defectors) before the Professor recruited her for the heist. She serves as the narrator of the series and is the Korean version of the original Tokyo who she is portrayed by Úrsula Corberó.
 Lee Hyun-woo as Rio / Han Joseph
 The "maknae" (the youngest person) of the heist group and skilled hacker. He is a medical school dropout and son of an affluent family and the Korean version of the original Rio who he is portrayed by Miguel Herrán.
 Lee Won-jong as Moscow / Oh Man-sik
 An ex-convict, who raised his son Denver alone, after his wife left him. He was constantly in and out of prison prior to the heist and is the Korean version of the original Moscow who he is portrayed by Paco Tous.
 Kim Ji-hoon as Denver / Oh Taek-su
 Moscow's son and underground fighter, who later falls for Mi-seon, one of the hostages at the Mint and is the Korean version of the original Denver who he is portrayed by Jaime Lorente.
 Jang Yoon-ju as Nairobi / Sim Young-mun
 A con artist who was recruited by the Professor, she is the Korean version of the original Nairobi who she is portrayed by Alba Flores.
 Kim Ji-hun as Helsinki / Ko Myung-tae
 Oslo's brother and former member of a gang in Yanbian, he is the Korean version of the original Helsinki who he is portrayed by Darko Perić.
 Lee Kyu-ho as Oslo / Lee Sang-yeon
Helsinki's brother and former member of a gang in Yanbian, he is the Korean version of the original Oslo who he is portrayed by Roberto García Ruiz.

Task Force 
 Kim Yun-jin as Seon Woo-jin, a crisis negotiation team leader belonging to the National Police Agency in South Korea. She is based on Raquel Murillo aka Lisbon, an inspector and negotiator with the Spanish National Police Corps who later becomes a member of the original gang, who she is portrayed by Itziar Ituño.
 Kim Sung-oh as Captain Cha Moo-hyuk, a former special agent from North Korea who was dispatched to handle the hostage crisis. He is based on Ángel Rubio, a deputy inspector with the Spanish National Police Corps who is Raquel's second-in-command, who he is portrayed by Fernando Soto.
 Park Su-yeong as Yun Chang-su 
JEA Police Chief
 Sun Woo-seong as Nam Dong-cheol 
Gyeonggi Police Agency Sergeant

Hostages 
 Park Myung-hoon as Cho Young-min
Director of the Mint Bureau. He only cares about his own safety and disregards the others' welfare. He has an affair with Mi-seon despite being married with two children. He is based on Arturo Román, the Director of the Royal Mint of Spain who he is portrayed by Enrique Arce.
 Lee Joo-bin as Yoon Mi-seon
An employee in charge of accounting at the Mint. She is Young-min's lover, and later falls for Denver. Based on the character of Mónica Gaztambide aka Stockholm who she is portrayed by Esther Acebo.
 Lee Si-woo as Anne Kim
 A high school student and the daughter of the U.S. Ambassador, who came with her class for a field trip at the Mint. She is one of the hostages and is based on Alison Parker, the daughter of the British ambassador to Spain who she is portrayed by María Pedraza.
 Hong In as Hwang Hyun-ho 
 Deputy director of the Mint Bureau installed in JEA, a general economic zone on the Korean Peninsula.
 Gil Eun-seong as Park Chul-woo 
 A member of the North Korean military special operations unit who infiltrates the bandit-occupied Mint.

Others 
 Lim Ji-yeon as Seoul
 The leader of the mercenaries outside the mint to help the robbers.
Lim Hyeong-guk as Jeon Yong-soo
 A leader who came down from the North Korean for inter-Korean economic cooperation
 Jang Hyun-sung as Kim Sang-man
 A politician who is the former husband of Woo-jin. He is quite similar to Raquel Murillo's ex-husband Alberto Vicuña, a forensic examiner with the Spanish National Police Corps, who he is portrayed by Miquel García Borda.
 Gil Eun-Seong as Kim Chul-yoon
 a former special agent from North Korea.
Han Seo-jin as Kim Min-ah
 Seon Woo-jin's and Kim Sang-man's daughter
 Yi Yong-nyeo as Park Pil-sun
 Seon Woon-jin's mother 
 Kim Jun as Nairobi's son
 Jeong Jae-seong as Marshall Kim
 U.S. Ambassador to Korea and Anne Kim's father
 Yi Chang-hun as Oh Jae-yoon 
 The chairman of Ohsung Group, a supporter of Kim Sang-man and a person at the pinnacle of fulfilling his desires through the establishment of an inter-Korean economic cooperation model

Episodes

Production

Development 
In June 2020, it was reported that BH Entertainment was planning for a remake of Money Heist co-producing it with Zium Content. They were in talks with Netflix, and it was in the development stage. On December 1, it was reported that a Korean remake of the series has been confirmed by Netflix with Kim Hong-sun as director and Ryu Yong-jae as script writer. BH Entertainment will be in charge of production, with the series having 12 episodes.

Casting 
On March 31, the casting line-up was confirmed by Netflix. After finalising the cast, the story and characters were formulated. The focus was to keep the narrative of the original and the attributes of the characters alive. Lim Ji-yeon joined the cast in April 2021. Lee Hyun-woo replaced Park Jung-woo due to date conflicts with the series Fly High Butterfly. The Korean cast was compared by drawing the similarities and differences among the original and the adaptation.

Filming 
Filming was suspended on July 7, 2021, to accommodate guidelines intended to limit the spread of COVID-19.

On January 17, 2022, Netflix revealed the English title of the series: Money Heist: Korea – Joint Economic Area.

On April 29, 2022, it was announced that Money Heist: Korea – Joint Economic Area would be released on June 24, 2022.

On May 20, 2022, the official teaser was released.

Reception

Viewership
Money Heist: Korea – Joint Economic Area featuring in Global Top 10 weekly list of the most-watched international Netflix TV shows, topped the list with 33,740,000 viewing hours in the week from June 20 to June 26 and with 49,000,000 viewing hours in the week from June 27 to July 3. In the week July 4 to July 10 it was at 3rd place with 15,630,000 viewing hours. Additionally it ranked first in the Top-10 list of 51 countries.

Critical response
On the review aggregator Rotten Tomatoes, the series has an approval rating of 79% based on 14 reviews, with an average rating of 6.60/10. Its critical consensus reads "This Korean remake of Money Heist pilfers from the original to the point of holding no surprises for established fans, but the execution is slick and blueprint rock-solid." On Metacritic, the series has a weighted average score of 56 out of 100 based on 6 critics, indicating "mixed or average reviews".

Joel Keller of Decider appreciated the performances of Yoo Ji-tae as the Professor, Jeon Jong-seo as Tokyo and Kim Yun-jin as Seon Woo-jin, writing, "each providing just the right tone to make the show less an over-the-top heist series and more of a layered treatise on the economic gap that everyone is suffering through at this stage in world history." Keller concluded, "If you're a fan of Money Heist, you'll like Money Heist: Korea – Joint Economic Area." Pierce Conran of the South China Morning Post rated the series with 3.5 out of 5 stars and wrote, "the purpose of Money Heist is to entertain rather than educate, and entertain it does with a story that hums along with all the thrills and twists required of a well-planned and inventively thwarted heist narrative."

Daniel Hart of Ready Steady Cut graded the part 1 of season 1 with 3.5 stars out of 5 and wrote, "The production is impressive, the script is punchy, and the characters do well to represent their original counterparts." In conclusion, Hart wrote, "this remake is worth the time and investment, at least for the purely invested performances and production. Money Heist is back, so we shouldn't grumble." Kate Sánchez writing in Butwhythopodcast rated the part 1 8.5/10 and praised the cast writing, "Money Heist Korea is a phenomenal series because of its cast". Sánchez liked the chemistry between cast, writing, "chemistry that crackles between each and every cast member that pushes Money Heist Korea to be a dynamic show with uncertainty running through every scene." Concluding her review, Sánchez wrote, "Ultimately Money Heist is expertly crafted to push tension and showcase action while also managing to investigate the way people interact with each other." S. Poorvaja of The Hindu wrote, "The first season of Money Heist: Korea - Joint Economic Area gets right in terms of its setting and characters, but here's hoping the makers push the envelope and take some risks in the second season."

References

External links 
 
 
 
 

Money Heist
Crime thriller television series
South Korean crime television series
Korean-language Netflix original programming
2022 South Korean television series debuts
Television productions suspended due to the COVID-19 pandemic
South Korean television series based on non-South Korean television series
North Korea in fiction
Non-Spanish television series based on Spanish television series